Live at NEARFest is a live album by Strawbs. It was recorded at NEARFest in Bethlehem, Pennsylvania on July 11, 2004 and featured the line-up which played together on the albums Hero and Heroine (1974), Ghosts (1975), and Déjà Fou (2004).

Track listing

"Out in the Cold" (Dave Cousins) – 3:13
"Round and Round" (Cousins) – 5:31
"Lay Down" (Cousins) – 4:19
"Burning for Me" (Cousins, John Mealing) – 5:55
"New World" (Cousins) – 3:54
"Autumn" – 10:11
"Heroine's Theme" (John Hawken)
"Deep Summer Sleep" (Cousins)
"The Winter Long" (Cousins)
"Remembering/You and I (When We Were Very Young)" (Hawking, Cousins) – 5:37
"Heartbreaker" (Dave Lambert) – 4:40
"This Barren Land" (Cousins) – 4:43
"The River" (Cousins) – 3:02
"Down by the Sea" (Cousins) – 8:37
"Hero and Heroine" (Cousins) – 3:33
"Round and Round" (reprise) (Cousins) – 3:34
"Here Today, Gone Tomorrow" (Cousins) – 5:05

Personnel

Dave Cousins – lead vocals, backing vocals, acoustic guitar, electric guitar, banjo, dulcimer
Dave Lambert – lead vocals, backing vocals, electric guitar, acoustic guitar
Chas Cronk – bass guitar, bass pedals, 12-string guitar, backing vocals
John Hawken – keyboards
Rod Coombes – drums, percussion

Recording

Recorded live at the NEARFest festival, Bethlehem, Pennsylvania.

Steve Crimmel – producer, engineer

Release history

References

External links
Live at NEARFest on Strawbsweb

2005 live albums
Strawbs live albums